Orconte is a commune in the Marne department in north-eastern France.

Second World War
Captain Antoine de Saint Exupery (1900- 1944) stayed in the commune during winter 1939, with the Groupe de Grande Reconnaissance 2/33 (Reconnaissance Group II/23). He evokes this period and the farm (opposite the church) where he lived in Pilote de guerre, translated into English as Flight to Arras.

In September 1944, the United States Army Air Forces established a temporary airfield Advanced Landing Ground, known as "A-66" near Orconte.   The Ninth Air Force 354th Fighter Group flew P-51 Mustangs and P-47 Thunderbolts from the airfield from  15 September until 11 December 1944.  The unit moved east with the advancing Allied armies and the airfield was dismantled with the land being returned to agricultural use.

See also
Communes of the Marne department

References

Communes of Marne (department)